Scandinavian migration to Britain is a phenomenon that has occurred at different periods over the past 1,200 years. Over the last couple of centuries, there has been regular migration from Scandinavia to Great Britain, from families looking to settle, businesspeople, academics to migrant workers, particularly those in the oil industry.

Scandinavian ancestry of British peoples
A study into the Scandinavian ancestry of British peoples found that there is evidence of particular concentrations in the Isle of Man, Shetland and Orkney; and to a lesser degree, in the Western Isles of Scotland and in the Wirral, West Lancashire, Cumbria and Yorkshire in England.

Contemporary migration
The 2001 UK Census recorded 22,525 people born in Sweden, 18,695 in Denmark, 13,798 in Norway, 11,322 in Finland and 1,552 in Iceland. 

In more recent estimates by the Office for National Statistics, Sweden was the only Scandinavian country to feature in the top 60 foreign countries of birth of UK residents in 2013, with an estimated 27,000 people.

Notable individuals

The table below includes Britons with significant recent Nordic ancestry.

See also
Swedes in the United Kingdom
Danelaw
Scandinavian migration to France

References

Anglo-Norse England
History of immigration to the United Kingdom
 
 
 
 
 
Immigration to the United Kingdom by country of origin
Scandinavian migration to the United Kingdom